La Caixa, also known as the "La Caixa" Foundation, is a not-for-profit banking foundation based in Catalonia.  Originally a savings bank (caja), it reorganized in the 2000s and 2010s: Its commercial assets are managed under its subsidiary CriteriaCaixa, which also has partial ownership of La Caixa's old banking business CaixaBank; those are used to fund La Caixa's  — social, cultural, scientific, and civic projects for the public good.

Its official home is in Palma de Mallorca.

History

Ancestry

Caja de Barcelona
At the time of the 1990 merger, the Caja de Barcelona was the third largest savings bank in Spain.

Caja de Pensiones
The  was formed in 1904 in Catalonia by Francesc Moragas, and opened to the public in 1905, expanding to the Balearic Islands in 1915.

The  was formally created in 1918 to oversee the Caja's social work.

In 1969, the  became the first in Europe to begin real-time computerized tele-processing of transactions, allowing customers to do banking at any branch at will.

By the time of the 1990 merger, La Caixa was already the largest savings bank in Spain.

1990 organization

In 1995, La Caixa opened the first international representative offices in Porto, Portugal and Brussels, Belgium.

In January 2008, La Caixa bought part of Morgan Stanley's private banking business in Spain for almost 600 million euros and in 2010, the group acquired Caixa Girona, being one of the three savings bank integration operations that did not require assistance from the FROB (Fund for the orderly restructuring of the banking sector).

On 29 January 2008, Criteria CaixaCorp was included in IBEX 35. In addition, La Caixa acquired 14.91% of Bank of East Asia's capital.

It has a portfolio of industrial holdings in companies in the infrastructure, energy and communications sectors, among others.

Segregation of the banking business at CaixaBank and restructuring of the group 

On 27 January 2011, within the context of the restructuring of the financial system in Spain, the board of directors of La Caixa unveiled a complete reorganization of the group. The savings bank would transfer its banking business entirely (office network, client portfolio, assets, bank capital,...) to a subsidiary in which the majority of shares are held by the same savings bank (74%), which adopted the name of CaixaBank, and was formerly known as Criteria CaixaCorp.

In this way La Caixa ceased to conduct retail banking business, and its only activity was limited to the maintenance of La Caixa Social Work Project. Although the savings bank no longer operates financially, CaixaBank decided, in its offices and in the commercial relationship with its customers, to use the commercial pseudonym of La Caixa, leaving the brand "CaixaBank" solely for institutional use.

At the same time, in July 2011, another subsidiary of the group was created, in this case 100% owned by La Caixa, called Criteria CaixaHolding, which would not list on the stock exchange and would bring together the less attractive stocks such as real estate services (Servihabitat) and industrial holdings (Gas Natural Fenosa, Abertis...) and PortAventura World.

CaixaBank which is publicly traded, remained at the helm of the banking business, the insurer (SegurCaixa) and the more financially attractive shares in foreign banks and in Telefónica and Repsol.

In September 2011, CaixaBank acquired Bankpyme's banking and fund management business.

In March 2012, the group announced an agreement whereby it acquired for 979 million euros and subsequently integrated within CaixaBank the SIP (Institutional Protection Scheme) formed by Cajasol (including Caja de Guadalajara), Caja Navarra, CajaCanarias and Caja de Burgos, commercially known until then as Banca Cívica (Civic Bank). The "Civic Bank" brand was discarded and the SIP was liquidated, transferring its clients, offices and assets to CaixaBank. However, due to its cultural roots, the entity decided to maintain the savings banks' logos that gave rise to the integration in its offices and communications in the offices, combining them with that of the Catalan bank, but only in the territories of influence of each entity.

On 12 June 2013 the General Shareholders' Meeting of Banco de Valencia approved its integration into CaixaBank. It was agreed to maintain the Banco de Valencia brand in the offices held by the bank in the provinces of Valencia and Castellón with a dual label to indicate that they also belong to CaixaBank.

On 19 July 2013 the merger deed of Banco de Valencia and CaixaBank was registered in the commercial register, and the integration of Banco de Valencia into CaixaBank became fully effective.

After the absorption of Banco de Valencia by CaixaBank, both the offices of La Caixa and those of Banco de Valencia in the Region of Murcia regained the name of “Banco de Murcia", next to the star denoting La Caixa.

Transformation into a banking foundation 

On 10 April 2014 it was announced that its transformation into a banking foundation would be decided at the ordinary general meeting on May 22 to comply with the Savings Banks and Banking Foundations Law, which requires savings banks with indirect banking activity to be liquidated and transformed into foundations, responsible for managing social work projects. This would lead to a process of reorganization within the group, which would involve, on the one hand, the dissolution and liquidation of the La Caixa Foundation and, on the other hand, the transfer to Criteria CaixaHolding (100% of La Caixa) of the participation in CaixaBank.

On 22 May 2014, the general assembly of La Caixa approved its transformation into a banking foundation.

The foundation was established on 17 June 2014. As a result, on the one hand, the dissolution and liquidation of the La Caixa Foundation would occur, with the overall transfer of its assets and liabilities in favour of the La Caixa Banking Foundation, and, on the other hand, the transfer in favour of Criteria CaixaHolding of the participation of the Caixa at CaixaBank, so that the banking foundation would go on to hold its stake in CaixaBank through Criteria CaixaHolding, and the debt instruments of which La Caixa was the issuer. In this way, the group led by the new La Caixa Banking Foundation would have as main activities: the management of the entire Social Work, those of a financial nature related to the management of its participation in CaixaBank, the administration of the debt instruments that have La Caixa as an issuer, and the management of investments in industries other than finance grouped so far in Criteria CaixaHolding. The liquidation of the La Caixa Foundation took place on 16 October 2014 while the transfer of the stake in CaixaBank took place on 14 October 2014.

On 26 June 2014, the president of CaixaBank and until then president of the savings bank, Isidro Fainé, was elected president of the Board of Trustees of the La Caixa Banking Foundation.

Participation
The La Caixa Banking Foundation manages the Group's shareholdings through Criteria Caixa (formerly Criteria CaixaHolding), a equity instrumental company fully controlled by the foundation. The shares of Criteria Caixa include the ones owned in CaixaBank (as of 31 December 2018: 40.00%), as well as those held in several companies including Cellnex, Naturgy, Saba, Suez and Telefónica.

Social work 
As explained above, since September 2014, La Caixa Banking Foundation is responsible for managing the social work projects of the former savings bank. Until then, this work was carried out by the La Caixa Foundation.

In 2018, the La Caixa Banking Foundation had an allocated budget of 520 million euros. The foundation, one of the most significant worldwide, supported more than 11 million people in 2017, through nearly 50,000 initiatives. According to the OECD, La Caixa Banking Foundation’s financing for 2019 development increased by 58% to US$33.9 million.

See also 

 CaixaForum
 CriteriaCaixa

References

External links

 "La Caixa" Foundation — official English website

Banks established in 1990
Spanish companies established in 1990
 
Banking foundations
Companies of the Balearic Islands
Foundations based in Spain
Spanish brands